Biaora is a city  and municipality in Rajgarh district  in the state of Madhya Pradesh, India. biaora is one of the six tehsils of rajgarh district.Biaora was originally ruled by the Bhil kings; the last Bhil king was Dhola Bhil. The primary languages spoken in biaora are Malvi, English and Hindi. It is situated on  National Highway NH-3 and Jaipur National Highway.

Biaora is around 110 kilometres from Bhopal and  184 km from Indore and 120 km from Vidisha.

History and language
The city was known as Biyasalpur in the 17th century. The dialect of Malvi used in Biaora is Umadwadi. which is common in the Rajgarh sondhiya

Geography
Ajnar River is located in Biaora. Biaora lies on the northern edge of the Malwa plateau.Black soil, light red and core sands are the main soil type available in Biaora.

Transport 
The nearest airport is Bhopal. City  is connected with all the main cities of the country by rail and bus.
Railway line  connects to Delhi , Mumbai, Ahmdabad , Indore , Gwaliar, Chadigarh.
National Highway No.-3, Agra-Bombay Road and No.-
12 Biaora-Bhopal road passes through the city .

Demographics

As of the 2011 Census of India, Biaora had a population of 49093. Biaora has an average literacy rate of 75%, which is higher than the national average. Around 15% of the population is under six years of age.

Education 
Netaji Subhash Chandra PG college is main government institute for higher education , the college offer education in  Science , Commerce and humanities .
There are number of private educational institute as well . Govt. Girls Higher Secondary school and Excellence Higher secondary school and Model Higher secondary school are government schools providing education. Private school account for a big share in school education.

Religion
Biaora is a secular town. People of several religions live peacefully in the town. There are several temples like Anjali Lal, kali mata mandir, veshno devi, shivdham, radhakrishna mandir, vishva prem mandir 800-year-old chaturbhuj nath temple, 450-year-old Digambar Jain Mandir, Madhorai Ji Ki Haveli. Mosques include Jama Masjid, Hussaini Masjid, Imam Bada, Momanpura Masjid, Garhi Masjid, and Rajgarh district's 1st mosque Moti Masjid and Gurudwara in Biaora. The Anjali Lal temple is a very old and famous temple in Biaora, run by anjani lal mandir trust. 
Here is a majority of Hindu community very peacefully residing with minorities of Muslims, Jains, Buddhists, and a few Christians and Dawoodi Bohras. All live together and promote collective good and harmony.

Climate
Biaora has a humid subtropical climate, with three distinct seasons: summer, monsoon, and winter. Summers start in mid-March. The weather can be extremely hot in April and May, with daytime temperatures sometimes reaching . Average summer temperatures may reach , but the humidity is very low. Winters are moderate and usually dry. The monsoon season  typically occurs from mid-June to mid-September, contributing  of annual rains. Ninety-five per cent of the rain occurs during monsoon season.

References

Cities and towns in Bhiwani district